Jeremiah Eaton Cary (April 30, 1803 – November 9, 1881) was an American lawyer and politician who served one term as a United States representative from New York from 1843 to 1845.

Biography 
Cary was born in Coventry, Rhode Island on April 30, 1803, he attended public school. He moved to Cherry Valley, New York, in 1820, where he studied law. Cary was admitted to the bar in 1829 and commenced practice in New York City.

Congress 
He was elected as a Democrat to the 28th United States Congress (March 4, 1843 – March 3, 1845).

Later career and death 
After his term in office, he resumed the practice of law in New York City, moving to Plainfield, New Jersey in 1860, where he continued the practice of law. Cary died in 1881. He's buried at the Grace Episcopal Church Cemetery, Plainfield, N.J.

External links
 

1803 births
1881 deaths
Democratic Party members of the United States House of Representatives from New York (state)
People from Coventry, Rhode Island
People from Cherry Valley, New York
Politicians from Plainfield, New Jersey
19th-century American politicians